Junaid Alvi (born 25 December 1965) is a Pakistani former cricketer. He played eighteen first-class cricket matches for Pakistan Automobiles Corporation between 1983 and 1987.

See also
 List of Pakistan Automobiles Corporation cricketers

References

External links
 

1965 births
Living people
Pakistani cricketers
Pakistan Automobiles Corporation cricketers
Cricketers from Karachi